Mother Rose Angela Horan, S.P., (June 13, 1895 – August 19, 1985) was the Superior General of the Sisters of Providence of Saint Mary-of-the-Woods, Indiana, from 1960–1966. During her term, she supervised the division of the Congregation into separate regions as well as provinces. She expanded the ministries of the Sisters of Providence through Providence Retirement Home, opened in New Albany, Indiana, in 1962. Horan also oversaw the construction of Guerin High School in River Grove, Illinois, and sent Sisters of Providence to minister in Arequipa, Peru.

Born Mary Cecilia Horan in 1895 to Mary Farrell and Michael Horan, she entered the Sisters of Providence on September 6, 1913, at the age of 18. Taking the religious name of Sister Rose Angela, she professed first vows on August 15, 1916, and final vows on the same date in 1924. After earning a bachelor's degree from Saint Mary-of-the-Woods College and a Masters from Indiana State Teachers College, Horan spent many years teaching English and Latin in Illinois and Indiana. She was later awarded an honorary Doctor of Laws degree from Indiana State University.

A scholar, philosopher, and poet, Horan gave a talk on the "Philosophy of Aging" during the Sisters of Providence National Congress of 1973. She also wrote numerous poems, prose, and papers for the private use of her religious community.

Works
 The Story of Old St. John's: A Parish Rooted in Pioneer Indianapolis (1971)

References
 

 

 

 

20th-century American Roman Catholic nuns
Sisters of Providence of Saint Mary-of-the-Woods
1985 deaths
1895 births
Saint Mary-of-the-Woods College alumni
Indiana State University alumni
Schoolteachers from Indiana
20th-century American women educators
American women poets
20th-century American poets
20th-century American women writers
20th-century American educators